Kalmar or Kalmár is a surname. Notable people with the surname include: 

 Bert Kalmar (1884-1947), American songwriter
 Carlos Kalmar (born 1958), Uruguayan conductor
 Ferenc Kalmár (born 1955), Hungarian physicist and politician
 Henrik Kalmár, Hungarian dissident
 Ivan Kalmar, Canadian professor
 János Kalmár (born 1942), Hungarian fencer
 Jenő Kalmár (1908-1990), Hungarian footballer and coach
 László Kalmár (1905-1976), Hungarian mathematician
 Nick Kalmar (born 1987), Australian footballer
 Pál Kalmár (1900-1988), Hungarian pop singer
 Stefan Kalmár, German curator
 Zsolt Kalmár (born 1995), Hungarian footballer